Kristian Efremov (born 31 August 1990 in Veles) is a Macedonian sprinter. He represented his country at the 2012 Summer Olympics as well as two World Indoor Championships.

His personal bests in the event are 47.92 seconds outdoors (London 2012) and 49.49 seconds indoors (Stockholm 2016).

Competition record

References

1990 births
Living people
Sportspeople from Veles, North Macedonia
Macedonian male sprinters
Olympic athletes of North Macedonia
Athletes (track and field) at the 2012 Summer Olympics
European Games competitors for North Macedonia
Athletes (track and field) at the 2015 European Games
Athletes (track and field) at the 2013 Mediterranean Games
Mediterranean Games competitors for North Macedonia